Malik Asselah (born 8 July 1986) is an Algerian footballer who plays as a goalkeeper for the Algeria national football team.

Personal
Born in Algiers, Asselah is originally from the village of Ighil Imoula in the Tizi Ouzou Province.

Club career
A product of the NA Hussein Dey junior ranks, Asselah made his senior debut for the club in 2006.

At the end of the 2009-2010 season, he left NA Hussein Dey after they got relegated. He subsequently signed a one-year contract with JS Kabylie.

On 5 July 2022, Asselah joined Al-Kholood.

International career
On 31 December 2007 Asselah made his debut for the Algerian Under-23 National Team in a 1-0 friendly win over Saudi Arabia in Riyadh.

On 17 April 2008 he was called up to the Algerian A' National Team for an African Championship of Nations qualifier against Morocco but withdrew from the squad with an injury.

Asselah was called up to the senior Algeria squad for the 2017 Africa Cup of Nations qualifiers against Seychelles on 2 June 2016.

Honours
 Won the Algerian Cup once with JS Kabylie in 2010–11

References

1986 births
Algerian footballers
Living people
Footballers from Algiers
NA Hussein Dey players
JS Kabylie players
Al-Hazem F.C. players
Al-Kholood Club players
Kabyle people
Algerian Ligue Professionnelle 1 players
Saudi Professional League players
Saudi First Division League players
Expatriate footballers in Saudi Arabia
Algerian expatriate sportspeople in Saudi Arabia
Algeria under-23 international footballers
Algeria international footballers
Association football goalkeepers
2017 Africa Cup of Nations players
21st-century Algerian people